Greg Rusedski defeated Karol Kučera 6–4, 7–5 in the final to secure the title.

Seeds

  Carlos Moyá (first round)
  Marcelo Ríos (first round)
  Gustavo Kuerten (first round)
  Tim Henman (semifinals)
  Jan Siemerink (second round)
  Jim Courier (second round)
  Todd Woodbridge (first round)
  Alex O'Brien (quarterfinals)

Draw

Finals

Section 1

Section 2

External links
 1997 Nottingham Open Singles draw

Singles